The National Constitution Party, or simply Constitution Party, was a political party in Hungary from 1905 to 1910 and from 1913 to 1918.

History

The National Constitution Party was established on 18 November 1905 by the so-called group of "Dissidents", who formerly left the governing Liberal Party after the scandalous "handkerchief vote". The group was led by Gyula Andrássy the Younger. The Dissidents immediately joined the electoral alliance of opposition parties, the Coalition, which won a surprise victory in the 1905 parliamentary election.

When the political crisis was over after the 1906 parliamentary election, the Constitution Party strengthened its position within the Coalition, as Party of Independence and '48 vainly obtained the highest number of votes, Emperor-King Francis Joseph I did not accept the election results, because the Independence Party did not support the Austro-Hungarian Compromise of 1867, thus questioned the very foundation of the system. As a result, the monarch instructed the Constitution Party, which had '67 ideology, to form and dominate a government over the other allied parties. The designate Prime Minister Sándor Wekerle joined Constitution Party before the appointment, while Gyula Andrássy, Jr., Ignác Darányi and Lajos Jekelfalussy became ministers in the Wekerle II Cabinet.

Shortly before the 1910 parliamentary election, Andrássy and his party joined the newly formed conservative-liberal National Party of Work. Due to internal tensions, Andrássy and his supporters left the governing party and re-established the National Constitution Party in September 1913. Count János Hadik was elected its leader. On 25 January 1918, some of the party members under the leadership of Prime Minister Wekerle, left the party to form the Constitution Party of '48, which would have been a strong governing party for the proposed 1918 parliamentary election. Hadik and his supporters remained in the National Constitution Party. Hadik was appointed Prime Minister on 30 October 1918 by Charles IV, however the Aster Revolution swept away the dual monarchy. The party was banned, among others, in November 1918.

Election results

Leaders

References

Defunct political parties in Hungary
Political parties established in 1905
Political parties disestablished in 1918
Political parties in Austria-Hungary
1905 establishments in Austria-Hungary